DMC Mining Services is a mining services contractor, otherwise known as a mining contractor. Its headquarters are in Vaughan, Ontario, and Salt Lake City, Utah.

The company began in 1980 as Dynatec Mining Limited. DMC Mining Services had three ownership assets in its portfolio: Ambatovy, FNX Interest, and Coal-Bed Methane. Dynatec Mining Limited began as a privately held mining services company that specialized in shaft sinking, mine construction, lateral development for hard rock and soft rock mines, and raise development. The company's principal founders were W. Robert Dengler, William M. Shaver, and Fred Edwards. Dynatec grew to become one of the major Canadian mine contracting firms providing services to the mining industry in Canada and abroad and was employed by many of the major mining companies.

Dynatec Mining Limited was acquired by the Metallurgical services division of Sherritt International and spun out as a publicly traded company "Dynatec Corporation" on the TSX as a dividend in kind to Sherritt shareholders. The company's focus shifted to equity ownership of mining properties through the late 1990s until it was subsequently acquired in a friendly takeover offer by Sherritt during 2007.

In October 2007 Sherritt sold the mining services division of the former Dynatec Corporation to FNX Mining.

References

External links
DMC Mining Services

Mining companies of Canada
Companies based in Vaughan
Mining engineering companies